The U.S. Bank Building is a low-rise U.S. Bancorp office building located in Sioux Falls, South Dakota. At 128.93 feet, it is the 7th tallest building in Sioux Falls, and the 9th tallest in the state of South Dakota.

References

Buildings and structures in Sioux Falls, South Dakota
Office buildings in South Dakota